Elmer Royce Williams (born 4 April 1925) is a retired United States Naval Aviator. He is known for his solo dogfight with seven Soviet pilots during the Korean War, which, according to The San Diego Union-Tribune, has been called "one of the greatest feats in aviation history" by military experts. A retired admiral and multiple members of Congress have been campaigning for him to receive the Medal of Honor for his exploit.  On January 20, 2023, he received the Navy Crossthe highest military decoration given by the U.S. Navyfrom Secretary of the Navy Carlos Del Toro.

Early life and military career
Royce Williams grew up in Wilmot, South Dakota. He and his brother both aspired to fly, and both enlisted after the 1941 Pearl Harbor attack. Williams remained in the Navy while attending college in Minnesota, and qualified as a United States Naval Aviator at Pensacola in August 1945. He learned to fly the F9F-5 Panther jet and was assigned to active duty in the Korean War, where he flew 70 missions.

On 18 November 1952, on his second mission of the day, while on combat air patrol near Hoeryong, North Korea, his group of four pilots spotted seven MiG-15s overhead. The other three pilots had to return to the carrier and the MiGs began to fire on Williams, putting him into a one-man dogfight with seven MiG-15s that lasted 35 minutes. It is believed to be the longest dogfight in U.S. Navy history. Commanders on his carrier ordered him away, but Williams had to tell them that he was already fighting for his life. He shot down four of the MiGs and likely hit two others. By the end of the 35-minute period, only one of the MiGs was still in the air with him, and he managed to escape back to his carrier, out of ammunition and having lost his hydraulics. He was uninjured, but 263 holes were counted in his Panther jet. He never saw the plane again; reportedly, it was pushed into the sea.

The story of his battle with the Soviet-piloted MiGs led to Williams being debriefed at the time by admirals, the Secretary of Defence, and a few weeks later by newly inaugurated President Dwight D. Eisenhower. These authorities made a decision to cover up the specifics of the battle, because at that time the Soviet Union was not officially a combatant in the Korean War and it was feared that publicity about the air battle would draw the Soviets further into the conflict. The dogfight was scrubbed from U.S. Navy and National Security Agency records, and Williams was sworn to secrecy about the incident – so much so that he never told anyone about it, not even his wife nor his pilot brother, until the Korean War records were declassified in 2002. The record of the incident in Navy records said only that he shot down one enemy (not listed as "Soviet") plane and damaged another, for which he was awarded the Silver Star in 1953. However, the dogfight was recorded in Soviet archives which were released after the fall of the Soviet Union in the 1990s. The Soviet records confirmed that of the seven MiGs, only one returned to its base. A 2014 Russian book, Red Devils over the Yalu: A Chronicle of Soviet Aerial Operations in the Korean War 1950–53, reported the battle and named Williams. The four MiGs were flown by Soviet Naval Aviation pilots, with Captains Belyakov and Vandalov, and Lieutenants Pakhomkin and Tarshinov being shot down. In his book Holding the Line about Task Force 77, Thomas McKelvey Cleaver described the fight, saying "On November 18, 1952, Royce Williams became the top-scoring carrier-based naval aviator and the top-scoring naval aviator in a Navy jet of the 'forgotten war'." He added, "In the fight of his life, Royce Williams had accomplished what no other American fighter pilot would ever accomplish: shoot down four MiG-15s in one fight."

Between 1965 and 1967, he flew 110 missions in A-4 Skyhawks and F-4 Phantoms from the aircraft carrier  during the Vietnam War. Williams was captain of the command ship  between September 1969 and January 1971. He retired from the Navy as a captain in 1980. In retirement he lives in Escondido, California.

Medal of Honor campaign
There has been a years-long campaign to award Williams the Medal of Honor for his exploit. In 2014, retired Rear Admiral Doniphan Shelton became aware of Williams's feat, and he tried unsuccessfully for years to get the Navy or Department of Defense to recommend him for the medal. He said that Williams's heroism was "unmatched either in the Korean War, the Vietnam War, or since then". On 14 July 2022, a bipartisan group of five congressmembers persuaded the House of Representatives to approve an amendment to the Defense Authorization Act which would award the medal to Williams. The amendment and bill were approved, which were then forwarded to the United States Senate. In 2021, one veteran who helped Shelton with his quest believed that there was still only a 75 percent chance of the medal being awarded; the key problem is that the dogfight is not recorded in official U.S. records.

In January 2023 Williams was awarded the Navy Cross as an upgrade of the Silver Star the Navy awarded him in 1953. The award was approved by U.S. Secretary of the Navy Carlos Del Toro, who said, "Having reviewed the findings of now numerous investigations related to the case of Capt. Royce Williams, I have determined this case to be special and extraordinary. His actions clearly distinguished himself during a high-risk mission and deserve proper recognition."

Awards and decorations
His medals include the Navy Cross, the Silver Star, two Distinguished Flying Crosses and the Legion of Merit with Combat "V".

Silver Star citation

Williams, Elmer R.
Lieutenant, U.S. Navy
Fighting Squadron 781 (VF-781), USS Oriskany (CVA-34) 
Date of Action: 18 November 1952

Citation:

The President of the United States of America takes pleasure in presenting the Silver Star to Lieutenant Elmer Royce Williams, United States Navy, for conspicuous gallantry and intrepidity in action while leading in aerial flight a division of three jet fighter planes attached to Fighter Squadron SEVEN HUNDRED EIGHTY-ONE (VF-781), embarked in the U.S.S. ORISKANY (CVA-34), in Korea, on 18 November 1952. While flying a combat patrol mission over Task Force 77 in the northeastern coastal waters of enemy-held North Korea, Lieutenant Williams demonstrated outstanding courage by placing himself and his accompanying planes between the Task Force and an attacking group of seven enemy MiG-15 aircraft, thereby protecting the Task Force from enemy attack. Having repelled the initial attack of enemy aircraft, he skillfully maneuvered his plane into position where he was able to make two firing passes on one of the enemy fighters. Breaking away after the second pass, he saw the enemy aircraft spiral into the sea. On a subsequent run he inflicted heavy damage to another enemy aircraft which was seen to smoke badly and retire immediately from action. Although his own plane was severely damaged by a direct 23-mm. hit from one enemy MiG-15 aircraft, he maneuvered to escape yet continued his direction of the engagement until he reached cloud cover in which he dodged the enemy and returned his almost uncontrollable aircraft on board the parent carrier. This skill and daring exhibited by Lieutenant Williams and his complete disregard for his own personal safety materially aided the accomplishment of the mission of the Task Force. His courageous actions were at all times in keeping with the highest traditions of the United States Naval Service.

In popular culture
In 2020, a 20-minute documentary, Actions Speak Louder Than Medals – the Royce Williams Story, directed by John Mollison, was screened at the GI Film Festival, San Diego.

References

1925 births
Living people
People from Roberts County, South Dakota
People from Escondido, California
Military personnel from South Dakota
Aviators from South Dakota
United States Naval Aviators
United States Navy captains
Recipients of the Navy Cross (United States)
Recipients of the Silver Star
Recipients of the Legion of Merit
Recipients of the Distinguished Flying Cross (United States)
Recipients of the Meritorious Service Medal (United States)
Recipients of the Air Medal
United States Navy personnel of the Korean War
United States Navy personnel of the Vietnam War
University of Minnesota alumni